National Skiing Association of Lithuania is a national governing body of skiing sport in Lithuania.

References

External links 
Official website

Skiing
1932 establishments in Lithuania
Sports organizations established in 1932
Lithuania
Skiing in Lithuania